Chiaraje (possibly from Aymara ch'iyara black, jaqhi precipice, cliff, "black cliff") is a mountain in the Vilcanota mountain range in the Andes of Peru, about  high. It is situated in the Cusco Region, Canchis Province, Sicuani District, and in the Puno Region, Melgar Province, Nuñoa District. Chiaraje lies south-west of the mountain Sambo and north-west of the mountain Chiaracce of the Nuñoa District.

References

Mountains of Peru
Mountains of Cusco Region
Mountains of Puno Region